Rhodoplanes oryzae is a Gram-negative, rod-shaped, phototrophic bacterium  from the genus of Rhodoplanes.

References

Nitrobacteraceae
Bacteria described in 2014